"The Happy Breed" is a short story by American writer John Sladek, originally published in Harlan Ellison's anthology Dangerous Visions (1967). It is Sladek's first published story.

Synopsis
The last five adults discuss how their lives have improved ever since the computers took over the world and made everything better for everyone all the time.

Reception
Graham Sleight called it "fine and cutting", and Keith Brooke described it as "grimly dystopian" and evidence that Sladek is "a true satirist". Algis Budrys said that "this is not an exactly new idea, nor is it newly proposed, nor does it go to any new place", published in Dangerous Visions "when Harlan got desperate for material".

References

External links 

1967 short stories
Science fiction short stories
Dystopian literature
Dangerous Visions short stories